Hiroyuki Takaya (Japanese: 高谷裕之, Takaya Hiroyuki, born June 10, 1977) is a Japanese mixed martial artist currently competing in the Featherweight division. A professional competitor since 2003, Takaya has fought in the WEC, Strikeforce, DREAM, Shooto, K-1 HERO'S, Pancrase, RIZIN, Vale Tudo Japan, and Cage Force. Takaya is the former DREAM Featherweight Champion. He also competed at the Japanese MMA events Fight For Japan: Genki Desu Ka Omisoka 2011 and Dynamite!! 2010. Due to his experience in street fighting, Takaya is known as the "Streetfight Bancho".

Mixed martial arts career
Takaya made his professional debut in the Shooto organization in a fight against Hayate Usul in 2003. After a 9-4-1 record in Shooto, Hero's, and Cage Force including bouts against top mixed martial artists like current Strikeforce Lightweight Champion Gilbert Melendez, Hero's Lightweight runner up Genki Sudo, and former Hero's Middleweight Champion Gesias Calvancante Takaya made his American debut at WEC 32 where he fought, and lost to, Leonard Garcia by knockout. Takaya then lost to Cub Swanson at WEC 37 losing by Unanimous Decision but won fight of the night honours.

DREAM
Takaya was a participant in the DREAM Featherweight Grand Prix.
Takaya beat Jong Won Kim, Yoshiro Maeda and Hideo Tokoro en route to the finals, before losing to Bibiano Fernandes via split decision become the runner up of the tournament.

Takaya scored perhaps the biggest win of his career over former DREAM Lightweight Champion Joachim Hansen on May 29, 2010 at DREAM.14 with 28 seconds left in the first round.  It was the first knockout defeat in the 10½-year career of Hansen.

On December 31, 2010, Takaya defeated Bibiano Fernandes via unanimous decision and became the DREAM Featherweight Champion.

He fought at Dream: Japan GP Final against Kazuyuki Miyata and successfully defended the DREAM Featherweight Championship.

Takaya defended his title on December 31, 2011 at Fight For Japan: Genki Desu Ka Omisoka 2011, defeating Takeshi Inoue via unanimous decision.

Strikeforce
Takaya fought on April 9, 2011 at Strikeforce: Diaz vs. Daley. He lost his fight against Robbie Peralta via split decision.

Rizin Fighting Federation
In his debut for the Rizin Fighting Federation, Takaya faced Daiki Hata on December 29, 2015.  He won the fight via unanimous decision.

Kickboxing
He lost to Hiroki Shishido by unanimous decision after being knocked down twice in round one at Shootboxing 2013: Act 2 in Tokyo on April 20, 2013.

Personal life
Takaya is married to Japanese fashion model Maho Miura.

Championships and accomplishments
DREAM
DREAM Featherweight Championship (One time, last)
2009 DREAM Featherweight Grand Prix Runner-Up
K-1 HERO'S
2005 K-1 HERO'S Middleweight Grand Prix Semifinalist
Shooto
2003 Shoot Lightweight Rookie Tournament Winner
World Extreme Cagefighting
Fight of the Night (One time)

Mixed martial arts record

|-
| Win
| align=center| 23-14-2
| Baataryn Azjavkhlan
| Decision (unanimous)
| Rizin World Grand Prix 2017: 2nd Round
| 
| align=center| 3
| align=center| 5:00
| Saitama Super Arena, Saitama, Japan
| 
|-
| Win
| align=center| 22-14-2
| Hatsu Hioki
| KO (punches)
| Pancrase 290
| 
| align=center|1
| align=center|1:12
| Tokyo, Japan
| 
|-
| Loss
| align=center| 21–14–1
| Isao Kobayashi
| Decision (unanimous)
| Pancrase 283
| 
| align=center| 3
| align=center| 5:00
| Tokyo, Japan
| 
|-
| Loss
| align=center| 21–13–1
| Alan Omer
| Decision (unanimous)
| Euro FC 1: The New Era
| 
| align=center| 3
| align=center| 5:00
| Espoo, Finland
| 
|-
| Loss
| align=center| 21–12–1
| Nazareno Malegarie
| Decision (unanimous)
|  Pancrase 278
| 
| align=center| 3
| align=center| 5:00
| Tokyo, Japan
| 
|-
| Win
| align=center| 21-11-2
| Daiki Hata
| Decision (unanimous)
| Rizin Fighting Federation 1: Day 1
| 
| align=center|3
| align=center|5:00
| Saitama, Japan
| 
|-
| Win
| align=center| 20-11-2
| Guy Delumeau
| TKO (punches)
|  Pancrase 266
| 
| align=center|3
| align=center|4:11
| Tokyo, Japan
| 
|-
| Win
| align=center| 19–11–2
| Ryogo Takahashi
| KO (punches)
| Vale Tudo Japan: VTJ 6th
| 
| align=center| 2
| align=center| 0:38
| Tokyo, Japan
| 
|-
| Win
| align=center| 18–11–2
| Yojiro Uchimara
| TKO (punches)
| Vale Tudo Japan: VTJ 4th
| 
| align=center| 1
| align=center| 1:27
| Tokyo, Japan
| 
|-
| Draw
| align=center| 17–11–2
| Toby Imada
| Draw (majority)
| Shoot Boxing: Ground Zero Tokyo 2013
| 
| align=center| 3
| align=center| 5:00
| Tokyo, Japan
| 
|-
| Loss
| align=center| 17–11–1
| Daniel Romero
| TKO (punches)
| Vale Tudo Japan: VTJ 2nd
| 
| align=center| 1
| align=center| 3:21
| Tokyo, Japan
| 
|-
| Loss
| align=center| 17–10–1
| Georgi Karakhanyan
| Decision (split)
| DREAM 18
| 
| align=center| 3
| align=center| 5:00
| Tokyo, Japan
| Non-title bout.
|-
| Win
| align=center| 17–9–1
| Takeshi Inoue
| Decision (unanimous)
| Fight For Japan: Genki Desu Ka Omisoka 2011
| 
| align=center| 5
| align=center| 5:00
| Tokyo, Japan, Japan
| <small> Defended DREAM Featherweight Championship.
|-
| Win
| align=center| 16–9–1
| Kazuyuki Miyata
| Decision (split)
| DREAM: Japan GP Final
| 
| align=center| 3
| align=center| 5:00
| Tokyo, Japan, Japan
| <small> Defended DREAM Featherweight Championship.
|-
| Loss
| align=center| 15–9–1
| Robbie Peralta
| Decision (split)
| Strikeforce: Diaz vs. Daley
| 
| align=center| 3
| align=center| 5:00
| San Diego, California, United States
| 
|-
| Win
| align=center| 15–8–1
| Bibiano Fernandes
| Decision (unanimous)
| Dynamite!! 2010
| 
| align=center| 3
| align=center| 5:00
| Saitama, Japan
| Won DREAM Featherweight Championship.
|-
| Win
| align=center| 14–8–1
| Chase Beebe
| KO (punches)
| DREAM 16
| 
| align=center| 1
| align=center| 1:45
| Nagoya, Japan
| 
|-
| Win
| align=center| 13–8–1
| Joachim Hansen
| KO (punches)
| DREAM 14
| 
| align=center| 1
| align=center| 4:32
| Saitama, Japan
| 
|-
| Loss
| align=center| 12–8–1
| Michihiro Omigawa
| TKO (punches)
| Dynamite!! The Power of Courage 2009
| 
| align=center| 1
| align=center| 2:54
| Saitama, Japan
| 
|-
| Loss
| align=center| 12–7–1
| Bibiano Fernandes
| Decision (split)
| DREAM 11
| 
| align=center| 2
| align=center| 5:00
| Yokohama, Japan
| 
|-
| Win
| align=center| 12–6–1
| Hideo Tokoro
| TKO (punches)
| DREAM 11
| 
| align=center| 2
| align=center| 0:32
| Yokohama, Japan
| 
|-
| Win
| align=center| 11–6–1
| Yoshiro Maeda
| TKO (punches)
| DREAM 9
| 
| align=center| 1
| align=center| 9:39
| Yokohama, Japan
| 
|-
| Win
| align=center| 10–6–1
| Jong Won Kim
| TKO (punches)
| DREAM 7
| 
| align=center| 2
| align=center| 0:40
| Saitama, Saitama, Japan
| 
|-
| Loss
| align=center| 9–6–1
| Cub Swanson
| Decision (unanimous)
| WEC 37
| 
| align=center| 3
| align=center| 5:00
| Las Vegas, Nevada, United States
| 
|-
| Loss
| align=center| 9–5–1
| Leonard Garcia
| KO (punch)
| WEC 32
| 
| align=center| 1
| align=center| 1:31
| Rio Rancho, New Mexico, United States
| 
|-
| Win
| align=center| 9–4–1
| Antonio Carvalho
| TKO (knees and punches)
| Shooto: Back To Our Roots 6
| 
| align=center| 3
| align=center| 1:58
| Tokyo, Japan
| 
|-
| Win
| align=center| 8–4–1
| Jarrod Card
| KO (punch)
| GCM: Cage Force 4
| 
| align=center| 1
| align=center| 3:02
| Tokyo, Japan
| 
|-
| Loss
| align=center| 7–4–1
| Andre Amade
| TKO (broken nose)
| HERO'S 8
| 
| align=center| 1
| align=center| 3:29
| Nagoya, Japan
| 
|-
| Loss
| align=center| 7–3–1
| Gesias Cavalcante
| KO (flying knee)
| HERO'S 6
| 
| align=center| 1
| align=center| 0:30
| Tokyo, Japan
| 
|-
| Win
| align=center| 7–2–1
| Do Hyung Kim
| Decision (unanimous)
| HERO'S 2005 in Seoul
| 
| align=center| 2
| align=center| 5:00
| Seoul, South Korea
| 
|-
| Loss
| align=center| 6–2–1
| Genki Sudo
| Submission (triangle choke)
| HERO'S 3
| 
| align=center| 2
| align=center| 3:47
| Tokyo, Japan
| 
|-
| Win
| align=center| 6–1–1
| Remigijus Morkevicius
| TKO (punches)
| HERO'S 3
| 
| align=center| 2
| align=center| 4:16
| Tokyo, Japan
| 
|-
| Win
| align=center| 5–1–1
| Jani Lax
| TKO (punch)
| HERO'S 2
| 
| align=center| 1
| align=center| 1:56
| Tokyo, Japan
| 
|-
| Loss
| align=center| 4–1–1
| Gilbert Melendez
| Decision (unanimous)
| Shooto: Year End Show 2004
| 
| align=center| 3
| align=center| 5:00
| Tokyo, Japan
| 
|-
| Win
| align=center| 4–0–1
| Stephen Palling
| KO (head kick)
| Shooto 2004: 5/3 in Korakuen Hall
| 
| align=center| 1
| align=center| 2:11
| Tokyo, Japan
| 
|-
| Draw
| align=center| 3–0–1
| João Roque
| Draw
| Shooto 2004: 1/24 in Korakuen Hall
| 
| align=center| 3
| align=center| 5:00
| Tokyo, Japan
| 
|-
| Win
| align=center| 3–0
| Seigi Fujioka
| Decision (unanimous)
| Shooto: Wanna Shooto 2003
| 
| align=center| 2
| align=center| 5:00
| Tokyo, Japan
| 
|-
| Win
| align=center| 2–0
| Hatsu Hioki
| Decision (unanimous)
| Shooto: 7/13 in Korakuen Hall
| 
| align=center| 2
| align=center| 5:00
| Tokyo, Japan
| 
|-
| Win
| align=center| 1–0
| Hayate Usui
| TKO (punches)
| Shooto: 2/6 in Kitazawa Town Hall
| 
| align=center| 2
| align=center| 2:06
| Tokyo, Japan
|

Kickboxing record

|-
|
|Loss
|align=left| Hiroki Shishido
|Shootboxing 2013: Act 2
|Tokyo, Japan
|Decision (unanimous)
|
|
|0-3
|
|-
|
|Loss
|align=left| Yuya Yamamoto
|AJKF: "Danger Zone"
|Tokyo, Japan
|Decision (unanimous)
|3
|3:00
|0-2
|
|-
|
|Loss
|align=left| Satoruvashicoba
|AJKF: "Strongest Tournament 2004 All Japan Lightweight 1st Stage"
|Japan
|Decision (unanimous)
|3
|3:00
|0-1
|Lightweight Tournament opening round.
|-
|-
| colspan=10 | Legend:

Notes and references

External links

Living people
1977 births
People from Narashino
Japanese male mixed martial artists
Featherweight mixed martial artists
Lightweight mixed martial artists
Mixed martial artists utilizing shootboxing
Japanese male kickboxers
Welterweight kickboxers
Wajitsu Keishukai